Ellesse Andrews (born 31 December 1999) is a New Zealand racing cyclist. She competed at the 2020 Summer Olympics, in Women's keirin, winning a silver medal.

She represented New Zealand at the 2018 Commonwealth Games and the 2020 Summer Olympics, gaining a silver medal in the Keirin in the latter event.

Early life
Andrews was born in Christchurch Women's Hospital at 23:45 on 31 December 1999, fifteen minutes short of the year 2000. Her father is Olympic cyclist Jon Andrews, who represented New Zealand at the 1990 Commonwealth Games and 1992 Summer Olympics. Her mother is Angela Mote-Andrews, who competed internationally in mountain biking. Mote-Andrews was preparing herself for her inaugural participation at world championships—the 1999 UCI Mountain Bike World Championships in Åre, Sweden—when she got pregnant. She has one younger sister, Zoe.

Andrews grew up in Wānaka and attended Mount Aspiring College until the end of Year 11 before moving to St Peter's School in Cambridge for the final two years of secondary school.

Cycling career
Andrews started cycling competitively aged 14, initially mountain biking but she soon changed to track cycling. She asked her father to pay for dance classes and a deal was made that they would do more cycling. Shortly afterwards, her father bought her a track bike, which got her into track cycling.

Andrews won four medals, including two gold at the UCI Junior Track Cycling World Championships. Competing in the Izu Velodrome, she won a silver medal at the 2020 Tokyo Olympics women's keirin. She had to go through the repechage to progress to quarter and semi finals. In the final, she moved into second place with two laps to go and held that place.

Major results
2016
UCI Junior World Track Cycling Championships
1st  Team sprint
3rd  Individual pursuit
2017
UCI Junior World Track Cycling Championships
1st  Individual pursuit 
2nd  Team pursuit
2018
Oceania Track Cycling Championships
1st  Individual pursuit 
2019
 UCI Track Cycling World Cup
3rd  Team Pursuit (Hong Kong) 
2021
 2020 Tokyo Olympic Games
2nd  Keirin
2022
 2022 Birmingham Commonwealth Games
 1st  Sprint
 1st  Team sprint
 1st  Women's keirin
 2nd  Team pursuit

Awards
Andrews won Secondary School Sportswoman of the Year at the February 2018 Waikato Regional Sports Awards. A week later, she won the Emerging Talent award at the Halberg Awards.

Notes

References

External links
 
 
 
 
 
 
 

1999 births
Living people
New Zealand female cyclists
Olympic cyclists of New Zealand
Olympic silver medalists for New Zealand
Olympic medalists in cycling
Cyclists at the 2020 Summer Olympics
Medalists at the 2020 Summer Olympics
Commonwealth Games medallists in cycling
Commonwealth Games gold medallists for New Zealand
Commonwealth Games silver medallists for New Zealand
Cyclists at the 2018 Commonwealth Games
Cyclists at the 2022 Commonwealth Games
People educated at Mount Aspiring College
People educated at St Peter's School, Cambridge
20th-century New Zealand women
21st-century New Zealand women
Medallists at the 2022 Commonwealth Games